The 2019 Marist Red Foxes football team represents Marist College in the 2019 NCAA Division I FCS football season. They are led by 28th-year head coach Jim Parady and play their home games at Tenney Stadium at Leonidoff Field. They are members of the Pioneer Football League.

Previous season
The Red Foxes finished the 2018 season 5–6, 5–3 in PFL play to finish in a tie for fourth place.

Preseason

Preseason coaches' poll
The Pioneer League released their preseason coaches' poll on July 30, 2019. The Red Foxes were picked to finish in fourth place.

Preseason All–PFL teams
The Red Foxes had four players selected to the preseason all–PFL teams.

Offense

First team

Juston Christian – WR

Defense

First team

Willie Barrett – LB

Brandon Miller – DB

Second team

Enmanuel Soriano – DL

Schedule

Game summaries

at Georgetown

Stetson

Cornell

Drake

at San Diego

Dartmouth

at Davidson

Butler

at Dayton

Jacksonville

at Valparaiso

References

Marist
Marist Red Foxes football seasons
Marist Red Foxes football